KTKB-FM, (101.9 FM) branded as Megamixx 101.9, is the first Filipino format station in the United States territory of Guam.

History
It was built in late 2002 by Rolly Manuntag—working for its owners from Skokie, Illinois—and officially opened on June 2, 2003.

DJs
 Doods of The Radio Breakfast eXtreme Show 
 DJ Tass of The Midday Request Express Show 
 Arnold of The Afternoon Shift: Plug n' Play Show
 Migz of The Flipside: Happy Hapon Show 
 DJ Cure & Mr Craig of The GroovyNights Show 
 Love Lines
 Rolly M. of The Saturdays with The Main Man
 Tita Gloria Diaz of The Dear Heart Show 
 Initial V of The Saturday Showtime 
 Johnny Z. of The i m radio (international music radio) Show

Format names

References 

http://www.mb.com.ph/islanders-shoppers-and-fire-dancers/

External links 
 101.9 Megamixx's Official Website
 Official Website
 Groovy Nights 2.0 Official Website
 
 

TKB-FM
Hot adult contemporary radio stations in the United States
2003 establishments in Guam
Radio stations established in 2003
Dededo, Guam
Philippine music
Filipino-American culture